Nexcite is a non-alcoholic carbonated beverage with a proprietary formulation of herbal extracts and a touch of caffeine.
Product development and production is located in Sweden.

The five "supplements"
Damiana - A herb derived from the leaves of a Latin American bush. It is said to have stimulating properties on blood circulation thought to give it mood enhancing, anti-depressive and libido enhancing qualities. However, these statements have not been proven.
Ginseng - Known for its many positive effects that improve physical and psychological performance.
Guarana - A South American seed extract which contains caffeine.
Maté - An increasingly popular herb with medicinal like qualities which aid in relaxation, stress relief and mood improvement as well as powers of concentration.
Schizandra - A herbal remedy made from a small red fruit growing in China. Known widely in the Far East for its ability to energize and vitalize the body.

References

http://www.nexcite.se/default.asp?page=homepage_inc2

Drink brands